Tomb KV59 is located in the Valley of the Kings, in Egypt. It is located north of KV37 and seems to be a tomb-commencement, but contained no remains.

References

Siliotti, A. Guide to the Valley of the Kings and to the Theban Necropolises and Temples, 1996, A.A. Gaddis, Cairo

External links
Theban Mapping Project: KV59 includes detailed maps of most of the tombs.

1906 archaeological discoveries
Valley of the Kings